Aleksander Brożyniak (born 2 January 1944) is a Polish football player and coach.

Career

Playing career
Aleksander Brożyniak played for Czuwaj Przemyśl, AZS AWF Warszawa and Resovia Rzeszów.

Coaching career
Aleksander Brożyniak managed Resovia Rzeszów, Wisła Kraków, Broń Radom, Pogoń Szczecin, AKS Busko Zdrój, Hutnik Kraków, BKS Bochnia, ZKS Unia Tarnów.

References

1944 births
Living people
Polish footballers
Polish football managers
Stal Mielec managers
Wisła Kraków managers
Polonia Bytom managers
Pogoń Szczecin managers
Hutnik Nowa Huta managers
Association footballers not categorized by position
Czuwaj Przemyśl players
People from Przemyśl